WHI may refer to:
W Holding Company, a failed bank holding company in Puerto Rico whose former NYSE ticker symbol was WHI
 Walgreens Health Initiatives, a Pharmacy Benefit Management subunit of Walgreens Health Services
Waterloo Hydrogeologic Inc., a groundwater software, training and consulting company
Women's Health Initiative, a large, longitudinal study of the health of women.
Women's Health Issues (journal), an academic journal on women's health